WSYB (1380 kHz) is a commercial AM radio station in Rutland, Vermont. Established in 1930, the station is owned by Pamal Broadcasting and broadcasts a sports radio format as "Fox Sports 1380".  Most of the programming comes from Fox Sports Radio, including Dan Patrick and Colin Cowherd.  Local high school and college sports coverage include football, basketball, and hockey.  WSYB is one of the oldest affilites on the Boston Red Sox Radio Network.

By day, WSYB is powered at 5,000 watts non-directional.  But to protect other stations on 1380 AM from interference, it greatly reduces power at night to 25 watts.  The transmitter and studios are on Dorr Drive in Rutland, near Otter Creek.  Programming is also heard on 250 watt FM translator W261DE at 100.1 MHz.

History
It is the second oldest radio station in Vermont, after WVMT Burlington. WSYB was launched by Henry Seward and Philip Weiss, owners of a music store at 33 Center Street in Rutland. The station broadcast on 1500 kilohertz at 100 watts in 1935. It switched to its current frequency in the mid-1940s. The WSYB call sign stands for, "We Serve You Best". Since the shut down of competitor 970 WHWB in 1993, WSYB remains the only AM radio station serving the local Rutland area. "The WSYB Christmas Fund" has been serving needy families in the Rutland community since the early 1970s.

For many years, WSYB broadcast with a 5,000 watt omnidirectional signal with one tower from local sunrise to local sunset. At night, WSYB utilized two towers with 1,000 watts and a pattern that was aimed mainly northeast of the transmitter site. While the daytime signal provides ample coverage for Rutland County, the nighttime signal missed most of the county south and west of the transmitter site. On the other hand, with the night time signal aimed to the northeast, there had been reception reports from listeners in the Canadian Maritimes, England, and even Finland.  In recent years, WSYB gave up its second tower and now broadcasts at a reduced power at night, but added an FM translator for listeners who prefer FM.

Some of the owners for WSYB over the years have included Vermont Radio Inc, All Communications Inc., H & D Media, Excalibur Media, and Clear Channel Communications. WSYB, its FM sister WZRT, and several other Clear Channel properties were swapped out to Pamal Broadcasting in exchange for WRNX in Northampton, Massachusetts. This swap gave Pamal ownership of five out the six commercial radio signals in the local Rutland area.

In the 1960s, 1970s and 1980s, WSYB featured an adult contemporary music format along with news, talk and sports.  It was an affiliate of the NBC Radio Network.  As music listening increasingly moved to the FM dial, WSYB added more talk programming.  By the 1990s, it had made the transition to a talk radio station.  On February 16, 2022, the station switched from talk to sports radio as "Fox Sports 1380."

References

External links

SYB
Sports radio stations in the United States
Fox Sports Radio stations
Pamal Broadcasting
Radio stations established in 1930
1930 establishments in Vermont